Heteresmia seabrai is a species of beetle in the family Cerambycidae. It was described by Lane and Prosen in 1961. It is known from Brazil and Peru.

References

Desmiphorini
Beetles described in 1961